Nikolaos Biris (born 1911, date of death unknown) was a Greek wrestler. He competed at the 1936 Summer Olympics and the 1948 Summer Olympics.

References

External links
 

1911 births
Year of death missing
Greek male sport wrestlers
Olympic wrestlers of Greece
Wrestlers at the 1936 Summer Olympics
Wrestlers at the 1948 Summer Olympics
Sportspeople from Athens